Carex vesca is a tussock-forming perennial in the family Cyperaceae. It is native to south eastern parts of the Brazil.

See also
 List of Carex species

References

vesca
Plants described in 1906
Taxa named by Georg Kükenthal
Flora of Brazil